Czechoslovakia competed at the 1956 Summer Olympics in Melbourne, Australia. 63 competitors, 51 men and 12 women, took part in 54 events in 10 sports.

Czech athlete Olga Fikotová won a gold medal in women's discus. She also started a famous love affair with American athlete Harold Vincent Connolly here.

The team was warned that their flight back to Czechoslovakia was in a danger of a terrorists' attack. All sportsmen had to undergo a long journey by a Soviet ship Gruzia from Melbourne to Vladivostok, Soviet Union and then by Trans-Siberian Railway to Moscow and by plane to Prague, Czechoslovakia. The whole journey took 31 days. The part of the journey from Melbourne to Moscow, Czechoslovakian sportsmen had to share a ship and train with Soviet sportsmen also returning home via this route. The coexistence was not idyllic and Czechoslovakians described it later as very humiliating. The Olympic team spent Christmas Day in the Pacific and New Year's Eve in Siberia. The team experienced high temperatures during voyage across equator and later freezing weather with -50 °C in Siberia.

It is very probable that the reason for the warning was only fictional and a long journey home was only a political decision made by Czechoslovak and Soviet communists. It was never justified.

Medalists

Athletics

Men's Marathon 
Emil Zátopek — 2:29:34 (→ 6th place)
Pavel Kantorek — 2:52:05 (→ 27th place)

Boxing

Canoeing

Cycling

Sprint
Ladislav Fouček — 6th place

Time trial
Ladislav Fouček — 1:11.4 (→  Silver Medal)

Tandem
Ladislav FoučekVáclav Machek —  Silver Medal

Team pursuit
František JursaJaroslav CihlárJirí NouzaJirí Opavský — 7th place

Individual road race
František Jursa — did not finish (→ no ranking)
Jaroslav Cihlár — did not finish (→ no ranking)
Jirí Nouza — did not finish (→ no ranking)
Jirí Opavský — did not finish (→ no ranking)

Gymnastics

Modern pentathlon

One male pentathlete represented Czechoslovakia in 1956.

Individual
 Vladimír Černý

Rowing

Czechoslovakia had eleven male rowers participate in two out of seven rowing events in 1956.

 Men's double sculls
 Albert Krajmer
 František Reich

 Men's eight
 Josef Věntus
 Eduard Antoch
 Ctibor Reiskup
 Jan Švéda
 Josef Švec
 Zdeněk Žára
 Jan Jindra
 Stanislav Lusk
 Miroslav Koranda (cox)

Shooting

Four shooters represented Czechoslovakia in 1956.

50 m pistol
 František Maxa

50 m rifle, three positions
 Otakar Hořínek

50 m rifle, prone
 Otakar Hořínek

Trap
 František Čapek
 Igor Treybal

Swimming

Weightlifting

References

External links
Official Olympic Reports
International Olympic Committee results database
Czech Olympic report (in Czech)

Nations at the 1956 Summer Olympics
1956
Summer Olympics